Events from the year 1763 in Sweden

Incumbents
 Monarch – Adolf Frederick

Events

 15 February - The end of the Seven Years' War.
 - An economic crisis results in the bankruptcy of several manufacturers. 
 - Sweden and Great Britain resume diplomatic contacts after fifteen years of estrangement. 
 - The new poor care law states that every congregation is responsible to provide for the poor in the parish.  
 - The first Chinese Pavilion at Drottningholm is dismantled and the second is built. 
 - Ode öfver själens styrka by Gustaf Fredrik Gyllenborg
 - Billingsfors Church is completed.

Births

 26 January –  Charles XIV John, king of Sweden and Norway (died 1844)
 29 March – Eberhard von Vegesack, Swedish army officer (died 1818)
 12 December – Margareta Alströmer, singer and painter, member of the Royal Swedish Academy of Arts and of the Royal Swedish Academy of Music  (died 1816)
 Jöns Peter Hemberg – member of parliament and founder of Skåne's Private Bank. (died 1834)

Deaths

 24 March – Catherine Charlotte De la Gardie, countess and courtier (born 1723) 
 30 May – Gustaviana Schröder, singer (born 1701)
 29 June – Hedvig Charlotta Nordenflycht, writer, feminist and salong hostess (born 1718) 
 11 July – Peter Forsskål, explorer, orientalist, naturalist and an apostle of Carl Linnaeus (born 1732) 
 12 August – Olof von Dalin, poet (born 1708)
 17 December – George Bogislaus Staël von Holstein, baron and field marshal (born 1685)

References

 
Years of the 18th century in Sweden
Sweden